Rozbijemy zabawę (pl. We will break up a party) was a short film written and directed by Roman Polański in 1957. According to Roman Polanski's autobiography, the film was a stunt which nearly got him thrown out of the Łódź film school; Polanski had organized a groups of "thugs" to go to a school dance and begin disrupting it. As the band played "When the Saints Go Marching In," some students were beaten up. The ironic alternate title is "Break Up the Dance".

External links
 

1957 films
Films directed by Roman Polanski
Films with screenplays by Roman Polanski
Polish short films
1950s Polish-language films
1957 short films